Gifted students are outstanding learners who are not usually considered at risk of academic failure or problems. However, gifted students can still underachieve. There are risks related to the student's giftedness. This concept was formally set forth in 1972 in the U.S. in the Marland Report:
Gifted and talented children are, in fact, deprived and can suffer psychological damage and permanent impairment of their abilities to function well which is equal to or greater than the similar deprivation suffered by any other population with special needs served by the Office of Education.

Specific risks
However, the following risks are listed in The Social and Emotional Development of Gifted Children:
 frustration, irritability, anxiety, tedium, and social isolation (p. 11)
 intense social isolation and stress among those with IQ greater than 160 (p. 14)
 difficulty making friends due to advanced concept of friendship, mostly among those less than age 10 (p. 23)
 de-motivation, low self-esteem, and social rejection among the exceptionally gifted (p. 26)
 emotional awareness beyond their ability to control (p. 34)
 difficulty with peer relations proportional to their IQ (p. 35)
 loneliness, anxieties, phobias, interpersonal problems, fear of failure, and perfectionism (p. 43)
 underachievement for social acceptance (p. 64)
 lack of resilience reinforced by easy work and well-intentioned but misguided praise (p. 65)
 increasing perfectionism throughout school years among girls (p. 75)
 fear of failure and risk avoidance due to perfectionism (p. 75)
 depression among creatively gifted (p. 93)

There is a cause-and-effect relationship between the unmet learning needs of gifted students and the above risks. “Research indicates that many of the emotional and social difficulties gifted students experience disappear when their educational climates are adapted to their level and pace of learning.”

Linda Kreger Silverman enumerates these additional risks:
 refusal to do routine, repetitive assignments 
 inappropriate criticism of others 
 lack of awareness of impact on others 
 difficulty accepting criticism
 hiding talents to fit in with peers 
 nonconformity and resistance to authority 
 poor study habits

Further, there exists anecdotal evidence of truancy problems with gifted children, who sometimes miss school because of disengagement, and worse, fear of bullying.  In 1999, legislation was introduced in Colorado to recognize gifted students as at-risk, with truancy as a factor, but the bill did not become law.

Lastly, meta-analysis from the paper "Gifted Students Who Drop Out—Who and Why: A Meta-Analytical Review of the Literature" shows two key points. First, 4.5% of high school dropouts are gifted, and they leave school in part because of school-related issues. One would expect a very few gifted children to drop out, given the ease with which they can excel in school. According to the Achievement Trap, this problem is even more pronounced among economically disadvantaged children.

See also
 Gifted education
 Intellectual giftedness
 Marland report
 Underachiever

References

Further reading
 Davidson, Jan and Bob, with Vanderkam, Laura (2004). Genius Denied: How to Stop Wasting Our Brightest Young Minds. New York, NY: Simon and Schuster.
 Neihart, M., Reis, S., Robinson, N., Moon, S. Ed. (2002). The Social and Emotional Development of Gifted Children: What Do We Know? Waco, TX: Prufrock Press.
 Silverman, L. K. (1993). Counseling the Gifted and Talented. Denver, CO: Love Publishing Company.

External links
 Achievement Trap: How America Is Failing Millions of High-Achieving Students from Lower-Income Families 
 Hoagies' - Gifted Students At Risk
 Overlooked Gems: A National Perspective on Low-Income Promising Learners
 SENG - Gifted kids at risk: Who's listening?

Education reform
Gifted education
Special education